Russell G. Method (June 27, 1897 – September 17, 1971) was an American football back who played six seasons in the National Football League with the Duluth Kelleys/Eskimos and Chicago Cardinals. He attended Denfeld High School in Duluth, Minnesota.

References

External links
Just Sports Stats

1897 births
1971 deaths
American football running backs
Duluth Kelleys players
Duluth Eskimos players
Chicago Cardinals players
Players of American football from Duluth, Minnesota